Q 100.7 FM is a radio station in Barbados. It was launched on  Monday 3rd May 2004  (a day before Alison Hinds gave birth to her daughter on Tuesday May 4th)  as Quality FM. The station airs mainly talk shows as well as a number of features (such as obituary announcements) previously broadcast by its sister station CBC 94.7 CBC 900 AM. Q 100.7 FM is marketed as the "Quality Talk, Quality Music" station.

Owned by the Government of Barbados's Caribbean Broadcasting Corporation (CBC), the station has studios located at The Pine, Saint Michael.

Q 100.7 FM broadcasts sittings of the Parliament of Barbados: the House of Assembly meets on Tuesdays at 10:30 AM, and sittings of the Senate take place on Wednesdays. Other regular programmes include Farmers' Corner every Monday, Wednesday, and Saturday at 5:30 AM, The Quarter Hour of Prayer Power every Monday and Friday at 5:45 AM as well as on Sundays at 3:45 PM, Healthy Living every Monday at 7:45 AM, Your Health and You on Wednesdays at 8:15 AM, Between Me and You on weekdays between 11:00 AM and 2:00 PM, Q in the Community every Thursday from 11:00 AM to 5:00 PM, the BARP 50+ Half-Hour every 2nd and 4th Monday of the month at 12:30 PM, the Q Sunday Morning Service each Sunday at 9:00 AM the new Food for the Soul programme on Sundays from 2:00 PM to 3:00 PM, with Hymns We Love at 5:15 PM. Also, there is the Watt's New? programme from the Barbados Light and Power Company every last Friday in every month  (except Public Holidays) at 8:45 AM, the Living With Dr. Sparman programme every Fridays from 8:30 AM to 9:00 AM, the Golden Soca Back In Time Show programme with Peter Boyce every Thursdays at 12:30 AM and every Saturdays at 11:30 PM, the Let's Talk About It programme every Weekdays from 9:00 AM to 11:00 AM (except Public Holidays), the Chalanis Wines Oldie Goldies Show with DJ King Scorpion every Saturdays from 2:00 PM to 4:00 PM, the Pharmaco Limited Oldie Goldies Show also every Saturdays from 4:00 PM to 5:00 PM, the Exodus Reggae Show with Andi Thornhill every Fridays from 8:15 PM to 12:00 Midnight, Football Fiesta again with Andi Thornhill Every Monday at 6:00 p.m.
And so much more. 100.7 FM, together with its sister station CBC Radio, plays music from the 1950s to the 1970s outside of its talk shows.

On Air Staff

Anthony "Admiral" Nelson
Jaquila Lewis
Wendell Forde
Mark Anthony
Kimberley Skeete
André Harewood
Anthony "Tony" Thompson
Anderson "Andi" Thornhill

Former On Air Staff

Lawrence "Larry" Mayers
Archillus "Archie" Weekes
Joanne Sealy
Peter Wilkinson (deceased)

See also
Caribbean Broadcasting Corporation (CBC)
List of radio stations in Barbados

External links
 

Caribbean Broadcasting Corporation
Radio stations in Barbados